Louis John Puma (November 5, 1935 – October 18, 2019), known professionally as Lou Palmer, was an American sportscaster.

Palmer was an employee at ESPN from 1978 (one year before the network launched on cable television) to 1985. He covered many top sports events and was a SportsCenter anchor and reporter. He was also one of the original studio anchors at WFAN, New York City, the nation's first All Sports Radio Station. Lou lived in Wellington, Florida, a suburb of West Palm Beach, where he ran an Adult Amateur Baseball League (founded 1992). He was a public address announcer for Florida State League games in Jupiter, Florida and Port St. Lucie, Florida, and worked in several baseball tournaments for NABA (National Adult Baseball Association). He was also the official scorer in spring training games for the St. Louis Cardinals beginning in 1998.

Born and raised in Newark, New Jersey, Palmer attended Barringer High School and played college baseball at Seton Hall University, South Orange, New Jersey and professionally in the farm systems of the New York Giants and Chicago White Sox.

Palmer died on October 18, 2019 at the age of 83.

References

1935 births
2019 deaths
American sports announcers
American reporters and correspondents
Barringer High School alumni
Baseball players from Florida
Baseball players from Newark, New Jersey
Deaths from lung cancer in Florida
Duluth-Superior White Sox players
North American Soccer League (1968–1984) commentators
People from Wellington, Florida
Selma Cloverleafs players
Seton Hall Pirates baseball players